March of the Falsettos is a 1981 musical with a book, lyrics, and music by William Finn. It is the second in a trilogy of musicals, preceded by In Trousers and followed by Falsettoland. March of the Falsettos and Falsettoland later formed the first and second act respectively of the 1992 musical Falsettos.

Concept
A sequel to In Trousers, the one-acter continues the story of Marvin and his journey in search of self-understanding, inner peace, and a life with a "happily ever after" ending. His extended family consists of ex-wife Trina, son Jason, gay lover Whizzer Brown, and psychiatrist Mendel, who complicates matters by becoming involved with Trina. By the end of the piece, Marvin's supposedly stable world has collapsed around him, but he at least knows he has salvaged his relationship with his son.

Production
The musical premiered Off-Broadway at Playwrights Horizons on May 20, 1981 and closed on September 26, 1981. It transferred to the Westside Theatre on October 13, 1981 and closed on January 31, 1982 after 268 performances. The musical then opened in Los Angeles at the Huntington Hartford Theater on April 21, 1982 and closed on July 2, 1982.  Directed by James Lapine, the cast included Michael Rupert (Marvin), Alison Fraser (Trina), James Kushner (Jason), Stephen Bogardus (Whizzer), and Chip Zien (Mendel).  In the Los Angeles production, the role of Jason was played by Craig Taro Gold, and the role of Trina was played by Melanie Chartoff.

An original cast recording of the musical was released by DRG Records.

The UK premiere of the show was at the intimate Library Theatre in Manchester, UK in 1987, directed by Roger Haines and Paul Kerryson.  This production, featuring Barry James, Martin Smith, Paddy Navin, Simon Green and Damien Walker, transferred to the Albery Theatre for a limited run from 24th March 1987 to 18th April 1987.

Finn completed his Marvin trilogy with Falsettoland, which eventually became, with March of the Falsettos, the two-act Broadway musical Falsettos.

Synopsis
It's 1979 in New York City. Marvin, his son Jason, his psychiatrist Mendel and his male lover Whizzer are "Four Jews In A Room Bitching" (technically, Whizzer's only "half Jewish"). Marvin steps forward to explain his situation: he has left his wife, Trina, for Whizzer, but Marvin wants "A Tight-Knit Family" and is attempting to forge a new family situation with the addition of Whizzer, a situation that no one is happy with.

Trina, on Marvin's recommendation, pays a visit to Mendel, where she wearily wonders how her life has turned out this way. Mendel, who is instantly attracted to her, tries to console her, telling her that "Love is Blind." Meanwhile, Marvin and Whizzer comment on their relationship: the two have very little in common, apart from the fact that they both love fighting and are insanely attracted to each other. Both worry that "The Thrill of First Love" is wearing off.

The cast presents an interlude: "Marvin at the Psychiatrist, a Three-Part Mini-Opera." In Part One, Mendel asks Marvin about his relationship with Whizzer and Marvin weighs the pros and cons of the relationship, ultimately concluding that he does love Whizzer. In Part Two, Mendel shifts the topic to Trina, and the session becomes one where Mendel, obviously aroused, interrogates Marvin about his ex-wife's bedroom habits. In Part Three, Marvin and Jason provide counterpoint on their strained relationship.

Jason, who is 10, is very worried that because, as he puts it, "My Father's a Homo," that he'll turn out to be one too and is very afraid of turning out like his father. Because he is worried, he acts up, and "Everyone tells Jason to See a Psychiatrist" immediately, a suggestion Jason staunchly rejects. It is only after Whizzer softly adds his voice to that of his parents that Jason agrees to see Mendel.

It is very clear that Marvin is trying to pigeon-hole Whizzer into the role of homemaker, and they fight. Meanwhile, Trina complains to Mendel how her role in the family dynamic is being phased out as Whizzer becomes increasingly prominent in Marvin and Jason's lives as Marvin continues to insist that all participants get along together as one extended family. All agree that "This Had Better Come To A Stop."

Jason is acting up again, and Trina phones Mendel frantically to "Please Come To Our House" for dinner and therapy. Mendel arrives and immediately charms Trina. He and Jason settle down for "Jason's Therapy," in which Jason frets about his future and Mendel, in a very round-about way, encourages him to simply relax and enjoy life. After several such dinner/sessions, Jason asks Mendel what his intentions are towards Trina, and Mendel makes "A Marriage Proposal." Clumsy and neurotic though he may be, he's sincere and Trina accepts him, to Marvin's fury. He is losing his "Tight-Knit Family (Reprise)," and also his therapist.

In "Trina's Song," Trina reflects on her situation: she is tired of the man's world she lives in, and even though she knows that Mendel is the same kind of man Marvin is, slightly childish and neurotic, he loves her, and she could do a lot worse. She may not be exactly happy, but he's hers. In contrast, the four men sing a hymn to masculinity in all its aspects, the three adults singing in a falsetto to match Jason's unbroken voice, in the "March of the Falsettos."

Marvin teaches Whizzer to play chess, but bitterness and ill feelings boil over "The Chess Game" until the fight to end all fights breaks out between the two, and they break up. Meanwhile, Trina and Mendel move in together and start "Making a Home." As he packs, Whizzer reflects on "The Games I Play" with his own heart, and he finally comes to the conclusion that he does not love Marvin.

Trina and Mendel send out wedding invitations, and Marvin loses all control. Confronting Trina, he incoherently accuses her of trying to ruin his life, finally breaking down in rage and slapping her ("Marvin Hits Trina"). Shocked by his actions, both reflect that "I Never Wanted To Love You," a sentiment Whizzer repeats to Marvin and Marvin repeats to Jason and Whizzer.

Marvin is finished with Whizzer and his relationship with Trina is in tatters, but he can at least salvage his relationship with Jason, who, to his (Jason's) immense relief, has just discovered women. Marvin sits down Jason for a talk, "Father to Son," and tells him that he loves him and no matter what kind of man Jason turns out to be, Marvin will always be there for him.

Song list
Source:Guide to Musical Theatre

Four Jews in a Room B*tching
A Tight-Knit Family
Love is Blind
The Thrill of First Love
Marvin at the Psychiatrist (A 3-Part Mini-Opera)
My Father's a Homo
Everyone Tells Jason to See a Psychiatrist
This Had Better Come to a Stop
I'm Breaking Down (Added for the Broadway run; written originally for In Trousers)
Please Come to My House
Jason's Therapy
A Marriage Proposal
Trina's Song
March of the Falsettos
The Chess Game
Making a Home
The Games I Play
Marvin Hits Trina
I Never Wanted to Love You
Father to Son

Critical reception
Frank Rich, in his review for The New York Times, wrote: "The songs are so fresh that the show is only a few bars old before one feels the unmistakable, revivifying charge of pure talent....However slight and predictable the raw materials, Mr. Finn has transformed them into a show that is funny and tender on its own contained, anecdotal terms."

Awards and nominations
The play won the 1981 Outer Critics Circle Award for Best Off-Broadway Play.

References

External links
Lortel Archives

1981 musicals
Off-Broadway musicals
LGBT-related musicals
Fiction set in 1979
Musicals by William Finn
Plays set in New York City
One-act musicals
Original musicals